Big Apple is an American crime drama television series that was originally broadcast in the United States on CBS from March 1 to April 5, 2001.

Plot
The story centers on two New York City Police Department detectives Mooney and Trout working with the FBI to solve a murder with ties to organized crime. A subplot involves Mooney's sister who is receiving hospice care for Lou Gehrig's Disease.

Cast
 Ed O'Neill as Det. Michael Mooney
 Kim Dickens as Sarah Day
 Michael Madsen as Terry Maddock
 Jeffrey Pierce as Det. Vincent Trout
 David Strathairn as FBI Agent Will Preecher
 Glynn Turman as Ted Olsen
 Titus Welliver as FBI Special Agent Jimmy Flynn
 Donnie Wahlberg as Chris Scott
 Brooke Smith as Lois Mooney

Episodes

Broadcast
Big Apple was originally slated to compete with NBC's very popular medical drama series ER. Although 13 episodes were commissioned, only 8 aired before CBS canceled the show and replaced it with the newsmagazine 48 Hours in the 10pm (EST) Thursday time slot. In 2008, the series aired in syndication on Universal HD.

Home media
CBS released all eight completed episodes on a two-disc DVD set in the United States on July 10, 2015, without special features.

Reception
Reviews of the show were largely positive. Variety called it "a triumph all around" and compared it favorably to NYPD Blue and Murder One. Entertainment Weekly praised O'Neill's performance as Detective Mooney and gave the show higher marks than Denis Leary's The Job.

Notes

References

External links
 
 

2000s American police procedural television series
2001 American television series debuts
2001 American television series endings
2000s American crime drama television series
CBS original programming
Television series by CBS Studios
Fictional portrayals of the New York City Police Department
Television series created by David Milch